Hypoptopoma muzuspi is a species of catfish of the family Loricariidae.

This catfish reaches a maximum length of  SL. It is demersal, being found in fresh water in the tropics.
 
Hypoptopoma muzuspi is native to South America, occurring in Rio Tocantins basin; known only from Rio Agua Fria, in the drainage of Rio Araguaia which is the main tributary of Rio Tocantins.

Interactions with humans
Hypoptopoma muzuspi is harmless to humans.

References

Aquino, A.E. and S.A. Schaefer, 2010. Systematics of the genus Hypoptopoma Günther, 1868 (Siluriformes, Loricariidae). Bull. Amer. Mus. Nat. Hist. 336:1-110. 

Hypoptopomatini
Catfish of South America
Fish of Bolivia
Fish of Brazil
Taxa named by Adriana Elbia Aquino
Taxa named by Scott Allen Schaefer
Fish described in 2010